ARM Hermenegildo Galeana may refer to one of the following Mexican Navy ships:

Mexican Navy ship names